Defending champion Kim Clijsters defeated Vera Zvonareva in the final, 6–2, 6–1 to win the women's singles tennis title at the 2010 US Open.

World No. 1 and three-time champion Serena Williams withdrew from the tournament due to foot surgery sustained from an exhibition match. Caroline Wozniacki was in contention to gain the top ranking by winning the title, but lost to Zvonareva in the semifinals.

This was the final major appearance for former world No. 3 Elena Dementieva; she was defeated in the fourth round by Samantha Stosur.

Seeds

Qualifying

Main draw

Finals

Top half

Section 1

Section 2

Section 3

Section 4

Bottom half

Section 5

Section 6

Section 7

Section 8

Championship match statistics

External links
 Draw
2010 US Open – Women's draws and results at the International Tennis Federation

Women's Singles
US Open (tennis) by year – Women's singles
2010 in women's tennis
2010 in American women's sports